The 2016 SEABA Cup was the qualifying event in the SEABA for the 2016 FIBA Asia Challenge. The fifth edition of the games took place from 22 May to 28 May 2016 in Bangkok, Thailand.

Automatically, only one spot was allotted for SEABA but due to the Philippines' runner-up finish in the 2015 FIBA Asia Championship, the subzone was awarded another slot, thus SEABA had two spots which was contested by five SEABA teams.

The  won their second tournament title by defeating the hosts  in the championship match, 97–80. However, both teams were already qualified to the main tournament as of 25 May due to their top two finish in the elimination round.

Squads

Standings

Round-robin results
All times are in Thailand Standard Time (UTC+07:00)

Final round
Top two teams qualify to the 2016 FIBA Asia Challenge.

Third place game

Final

Final standings

Awards

References

External links
 2016 SEABA Stankovic Cup Fixtures/Results

2016
International basketball competitions hosted by Thailand
2015–16 in Asian basketball
2015–16 in Philippine basketball
2015–16 in Malaysian basketball
2015–16 in Indonesian basketball
2015–16 in Singaporean basketball
2015–16 in Thai basketball